Aleksei Valeryevich Gulo (born 15 October 1973) is a retired Russian professional footballer who played as a defender. He made 61 appearances in the Veikkausliiga for Kotkan Työväen Palloilijat and also played for Metallurg Pikalyovo, Kuusankoski, KooTeePee and Rakuunat.

External links
 

1973 births
Living people
Footballers from Minsk
Russian footballers
Association football defenders
Kotkan Työväen Palloilijat players
FC KooTeePee players
Veikkausliiga players
Russian expatriate footballers
Expatriate footballers in Finland